Players and pairs who neither have high enough rankings nor receive wild cards may participate in a qualifying tournament held one week before the annual Wimbledon Tennis Championships.

Qualifiers

  Russell Simpson /  Larry Stefanki
  Pieter Aldrich /  Warren Green
  Bud Cox /  Michael Fancutt
  Gilad Bloom /  Amos Mansdorf
  Anand Amritraj /  Javier Frana

Lucky losers

  Russell Barlow /  Harald Rittersbacher

Qualifying draw

First qualifier

Second qualifier

Third qualifier

Fourth qualifier

Fifth qualifier

External links

1987 Wimbledon Championships – Men's draws and results at the International Tennis Federation

Men's Doubles Qualifying
Wimbledon Championship by year – Men's doubles qualifying